The Land of the Wandering Souls, or La terre des âmes errantes, is a 2000 French-Cambodian documentary film directed by Rithy Panh.

Synopsis
The film follows a Cambodian family as they work to dig a trench across Cambodia to lay the country's first optical fiber cable, depicting their hardships.

At one point during their excavation, the workers uncover a killing field, a remnant of the genocidal purges of the Khmer Rouge.

Reception
The Land of the Wandering Souls premiered at the 2000 Edinburgh International Film Festival. It went on to screen at around a dozen other film festivals, winning numerous awards, including:
 Banff Rockie Award for best social and political documentary at the Banff World Television Festival.
 Golden Gate Award for best current events film or video at the San Francisco International Film Festival.
 Best documentary feature (honorable mention) at the Vancouver International Film Festival. 	
 The  Robert and Frances Flaherty Prize at the Yamagata International Documentary Film Festival.
The film was also featured on "Wide Angle", a Public Broadcasting Service television series.

References

External links

 

2000 films
2000 documentary films
French documentary films
Cambodian documentary films
Khmer-language films
Documentary films about the Cambodian genocide
Films directed by Rithy Panh
2000s French films